The 2022 Commonwealth Games Qualifier was a cricket tournament played in Malaysia in January 2022. Five national teams competed for one place in the cricket tournament at the 2022 Commonwealth Games, in Birmingham, England, in July to August 2022. Matches in the qualification tournament were played as Women's Twenty20 Internationals (WT20Is).

In November 2020, the ICC announced the qualification process for the 2022 Commonwealth Games tournament. England automatically qualified as the hosts, and were joined by the six highest ranked sides as of 1 April 2021. The final place was decided by the Commonwealth Games Qualifier tournament.

Sri Lanka and Bangladesh both won their first three matches to set up a winner-takes-all contest on the last day of the event. Sri Lanka defeated Bangladesh by 22 runs to claim a place at the Commonwealth Games tournament. Sri Lankan captain Chamari Athapaththu was named as player of the series.

Squads

Scotland also named Orla Montgomery as a non-travelling reserve player. Sri Lanka also named Madushika Methtananda, Kawya Kavindi, Imesha Dulani and Sathya Sandeepani as standby players. Bangladesh named Jahanara Alam, Nuzhat Tasnia, Khadija Tul Kubra as standby players.

Warm-up matches

Points table

 Advanced to the Commonwealth Games cricket tournament

Fixtures

References

External links
 Series home at ESPN Cricinfo

Commonwealth Games Cricket Qualifier
Commonwealth Games Cricket Qualifier
International cricket competitions in Malaysia
Commonwealth Games Cricket Qualifier